Roshcha is a rural locality (a passing loop) in Churovskoye Rural Settlement, Sheksninsky District, Vologda Oblast, Russia. The population was 5 as of 2002.

Geography 
Roshcha is located 13 km east of Sheksna (the district's administrative centre) by road. Zhayno is the nearest rural locality.

References 

Rural localities in Sheksninsky District